National Highway 107 (NH 107) is a national highway in India running from Rudraprayag to Gaurikund in Uttarakhand.

See also
 List of National Highways in India by highway number
 National Highways Development Project

References

External links
NH 107 on OpenStreetMap

106
National highways in India